Novyye Karamaly (Yañı Qaramalı) is a rural locality (a village) in Novokalchirovsky Selsoviet, Aurgazinsky District, Bashkortostan, Russia. The population was 392 as of 2010. There are 7 streets.

Geography 
Novyye Karamaly is located 6 km northeast of Tolbazy (the district's administrative centre) by road. Novoitikeyevo is the nearest rural locality.

References 

Rural localities in Aurgazinsky District